Minister for Planning and Infrastructure may refer to:
Minister for Planning and Infrastructure (New South Wales)
Minister for Planning and Infrastructure (Western Australia)